The Ljubljana Central Pharmacy, or shortly the Central Pharmacy, is one of the most prominent buildings at Prešeren Square, the central square of the Slovenian capital of Ljubljana. It houses the city's central pharmacy.

The Neo-Renaissance building is located between Trubar Street and the Petkovšek Embankment. It was designed in 1896–97 by Ferdinand Hauser and was built before the end of the century by Gustav Tönnies, whereas the façade was carried out by Filip Supančič. Until World War II, the building also housed a cafe named the Prešeren Cafe after the poet France Prešeren (1800–1849).

References

External links

Mansions in Ljubljana
Renaissance Revival architecture in Ljubljana
Center District, Ljubljana
Houses completed in the 19th century